David H. Strack (March 2, 1923 – January 25, 2014) was an American athletic director for the University of Arizona and head basketball coach of the University of Michigan. He was inducted to the Indiana Basketball Hall of Fame.

Early life
Strack grew up in Indiana and graduated from Shortridge High School in Indianapolis, where he was the basketball team's captain and MVP in 1941 and named to the Indiana All-Star team. Strack played college basketball at the University of Michigan (UM), earning MVP honors in 1943 and 1946.

Basketball career
Strack briefly played professionally for the Indianapolis Kautskys of the NBL. He returned to UM and served as an assistant coach from 1948 to 1959, then left in June 1959 to become the head coach at the University of Idaho.

In May 1960, Strack was hired as the head coach back at the University of Michigan, and served from 1960 to 1968. He led the Wolverines to three Big Ten Conference titles (1964, 1965, 1966) and to the 1965 NCAA Tournament title game. Following his team's 24–4 record and runner-up finish in 1965, Strack was named the UPI College Basketball Coach of the Year.

Athletic director
In 1968, Strack became the University of Michigan's business manager, then the associate athletic director in 1970.

Strack resigned in January 1972 to become the athletic director of the University of Arizona. Strack's tenure at Arizona included the hiring of the first African-American head coach of a major university (basketball coach Fred Snowden) and the school's transition into Pac-10 athletic conference. In 1980, Strack was criticized following a scandal involving the football program's use of an athletic slush fund for improper payments to coaches, alumni and recruits. Strack resigned in July 1982 to become a professor of physical education.

In 1992, Strack was inducted into the Indiana Basketball Hall of Fame.

Personal life
In 1947, while attending the University of Michigan, Strack met and married Ruth Ann Mayer. They briefly lived in East Lansing, Michigan before moving to Ann Arbor to raise their five children. When he took the Arizona athletic director job, they moved to Tucson for his tenure and then to Prescott upon his retirement. They later returned to Tucson, where she died in 2011. Strack, aged 90, died of pneumonia in 2014.

Head coaching record

See also
 List of NCAA Division I Men's Final Four appearances by coach

References

External links
Strack coaching stats
Strack interview with the Arizona Daily Star (March 2013)

1923 births
2014 deaths
American men's basketball coaches
American men's basketball players
Arizona Wildcats athletic directors
Basketball coaches from Indiana
Basketball players from Indianapolis
College men's basketball head coaches in the United States
Idaho Vandals men's basketball coaches
Indianapolis Kautskys players
Michigan Wolverines men's basketball coaches
Michigan Wolverines men's basketball players
Shortridge High School alumni